Owen Jacob Anthony Foster (born 7 January 2005) is an English professional footballer who plays as a goalkeeper for  club Scunthorpe United.

Playing career
Born in Kingston upon Hull, Foster signed his first professional contract with Scunthorpe United on 1 April 2022. On 30 April 2022, Foster made his debut for Scunthorpe in a 1–1 draw against Hartlepool United and won the man of the match award. After the game, Scunthorpe boss Keith Hill backed Foster to go on to play for England. On the same day, he also received the club's Young Player of the Year award.

Personal life
Foster attended St Mary's College in Hull.

Honours

Individual
Scunthorpe United Young Player of the Year: 2021–22

References

External links

2005 births
Living people
English footballers
Footballers from Kingston upon Hull
Association football goalkeepers
Scunthorpe United F.C. players